, better known by her stage name , is a Japanese actress, voice actress and singer from Nishi-ku, Hiroshima. She is currently attached to Tokyo Actor's Consumer's Cooperative Society.

Tominaga is best known for her roles in Sazae-san (as Katsuo Isono), Persia, the Magic Fairy (as Persia Hayami), Anpanman (as Rollpanna and Dokin), Patlabor (as Noa Izumi), Maison Ikkoku (as Kozue Nanao), Rurouni Kenshin (as Myōjin Yahiko), Hell Teacher Nūbē (as Miki Hosokawa), DNA² (as Karin Aoi) and Bikkuriman 2000 (as Takeru).

Relationships
Tominaga married voice actor Kazuki Yao on June 29, 1990, though they later divorced. In August 2001 she married Yoshimoto Kogyo tarento Shōichirō Masumoto and gave birth to a daughter in January 2002.

Roles

Television animation
Tokimeki Tonight (1982) (Yōko Kamiya)
Persia, the Magic Fairy (1984) (Persia Hayami)
Maison Ikkoku (1986) (Kozue Nanao)
Hokuto no Ken 2 (1987) (Lin)
Mobile Police Patlabor (1989) (Noa Izumi)
Dragon Quest: Dai no Daibōken (1991) (Maam)
DNA² Dokokade Nakushita Aitsuno Aitsu (1994) (Karin Aoi)
Rurouni Kenshin Meiji Kenkaku Romantan (1996) (Myōjin Yahiko)
Hell Teacher Nūbē (1997) (Miki Hosokawa)
Yu-Gi-Oh! (1998) (Ailean Rao)
Fruits Basket (2001) (Ritsu Sōma)
Akazukin Chacha (1994) (Dorothy, Elizabeth, Teacher Oyuki, Mary)
Nurse Angel Ririka SOS (1995) (Yuko Uzaki)
Smile PreCure! (2012) (Majorina)

Unknown date
Anime Himitsu no Hanazono (Mary Lennox)
Araiguma Rascal (Alice Stevenson)
Astro Boy (Bea-chan)
Bikkuriman 2000 (Takeru)
Chikkun Takkun (Miko Minamida)
D.Gray-man (Fo)
Don Don Domel and Ron (Cherry)
Ginga Hyōryū Vifam (Clare Barbland)
Hunter × Hunter (2011) (Melody)
Hiroshi-Hiro-kun (Utako)
Maya the Honey Bee
Ojarumaru (Den-San)
Paranoia Agent (Kamome)
Pastel Yumi, the Magic Idol (Kakimaru)
Pokémon (Squirtle, Lara Laramie, Kay)
Porphy no Nagai Tabi (Mariannu)
Rascal the Raccoon (Alice Stevenson)
Sazae-san (Hayakawa-san (second voice), Ukie Isazaka (second voice), Katsuo Isono (third voice))
Shura no Toki - Age of Chaos (Oryō)
Soreike! Anpanman (Dokin-chan (second voice), Rollpanna, Akugidori (second voice), Shirokabu-kun, Tsumire-chan)
Suzuka (Suzune Asahina)
Touch (Kaori Shinozuka (first series), Yuka Nitta (second series))
Undersea Super Train: Marine Express (Pinoko)

OVA
Birth (1984) (Rasa)
Suashi no Houkago (1985) (Miiko, insert song)
Karuizawa Syndrome (xxxx) (Eri Tsunoda)
Kyūkyoku Chōjin R (1991) (Shīko Horikawa)
Maps (1994) (Ripuradō Gaisu)
Megazone 23 (1985) (Tomomi Murashita)
Yōma (1989) (Aya #2)

Theatrical animation
The Star of Cottonland (xxxx) (Chibi-neko)
Tatsu no Kotarō (xxxx) (Aya)
Nausicaä of the Valley of the Wind (1984) (Rastel)
Patlabor: The Movie (1989) (Noa Izumi)
Patlabor: The Movie 2 (1993) (Noa Izumi)
WXIII: Patlabor the Movie 3 (2002) (Noa Izumi)
Detective Conan: Zero the Enforcer (2018) (Sayoko Iwai)
Crayon Shin-chan: Crash! Graffiti Kingdom and Almost Four Heroes (2020) (Brief)

Video games
Snatcher (1992) (Mika Slayton, Katherine Gibson)
Idol Janshi Suchie-Pai series (1994–1998) (Rumi Sasaki)
Imagination Science World Gulliver Boy (1995) (Phoebe)
Last Bronx (1996) (Lisa Kusanami)
Magical Drop III (1997) (Fortune, Judgment, Temperance)
Metal Slug (1998) (Sophia, Ending song)
The King of Fighters 2001 (2001) (Ángel)
Pokémon (2003) (Squirtle)
Super Smash Bros. Brawl (2008) (Squirtle)
Puyo Puyo Tetris (2014) (O)
Super Smash Bros. Ultimate (2018) (Squirtle)
Dragon Quest XI: Echoes of an Elusive Age (2019) (The Seer, Puff-Puff Girl)
Puyo Puyo Tetris 2 (2020) (O)

Unknown date
Atelier Elie ~The Alchemist of Salburg 2~ (xxxx) (Romauge Bremer)
Winning Post 3 (xxxx) (Mii Tomino)

Dubbing roles

Live-action
The Adventures of the Wilderness Family (1979 TV Asahi edition) – Jenny Robinson (Hollye Holmes)
Ally McBeal – Hope Mercey (Alicia Witt)
Columbo – Audrey (Dawn Frame)
Commando (1987 TBS edition) – Jenny Matrix (Alyssa Milano)
CSI: Miami – Ivonne Fernandez (Melonie Diaz)
Dae Jang Geum – Jang-deok (Kim Yeo-jin)
The Exorcist (1980 TBS edition) – Regan MacNeil (Linda Blair)
For Love or Money – Andy Hart (Gabrielle Anwar)
The Goodbye Girl (1982 TBS edition) – Lucy McFadden (Quinn Cummings)
Law & Order: Criminal Intent – Trudy Pomeranski (J. Smith-Cameron)
Little House on the Prairie – Carrie Ingalls (Lindsay and Sidney Greenbush)
Paper Moon (1982 TV Asahi and 1984 TBS editions) – Addie Loggins (Tatum O'Neal)
The Pianist – Halina Szpilman (Jessica Kate Meyer)
Taxi Driver (1981 TBS edition) – Iris (Jodie Foster)

Animation
The Black Cauldron (Princess Eilonwy)
Chip 'n Dale Rescue Rangers (Gadget Hackwrench)
Teenage Mutant Ninja Turtles (BS2 dub) (April O'Neal)

Live-action roles
Ultraman Leo (1974–1975) (Ueda Kaoru)
Ultraman R/B (2018) (Booska (ep. 17)) 
Ultraman New Generation Chronicle (2019) (Booska)

Awards

References

External links
Official blog 
Official agency profile 

1966 births
Living people
Japanese child actresses
Japanese film actresses
Japanese stage actresses
Japanese television actresses
Japanese video game actresses
Japanese voice actresses
Musicians from Hiroshima
Voice actresses from Hiroshima
20th-century Japanese actresses
21st-century Japanese actresses
20th-century Japanese women singers
20th-century Japanese singers
21st-century Japanese women singers
21st-century Japanese singers